Romy Müller ( Schneider; born 26 July 1958 in Lübbenau, Bezirk Cottbus) is an East German athlete who competed mainly in the 100 metres and for the SC Dynamo Berlin and the Sportvereinigung Dynamo.

Biography
She competed for East Germany in the 1980 Summer Olympics held in Moscow, Russia in the 4 × 100 metres where she won the gold medal with her team mates Bärbel Wöckel, 100 m bronze medalist Ingrid Auerswald and 100 m silver medalist Marlies Göhr.

See also
 German all-time top lists – 100 metres

References

1958 births
Living people
People from Lübbenau
People from Bezirk Cottbus
East German female sprinters
Athletes (track and field) at the 1980 Summer Olympics
Olympic athletes of East Germany
Olympic gold medalists for East Germany
Medalists at the 1980 Summer Olympics
Olympic gold medalists in athletics (track and field)
Olympic female sprinters
Sportspeople from Brandenburg